Air Vice Marshal Sir William Sefton Brancker,  (22 March 1877 – 5 October 1930) was a British pioneer in civil and military aviation and senior officer of the Royal Flying Corps and later Royal Air Force. He was killed in an airship crash in 1930, exactly 20 years after his first flight.

Early life

Sefton Brancker was born in Woolwich, the eldest son of Col. William Godeffroy Brancker and Hester Adelaide, the daughter of Major General Henry Charles Russell. Brancker grew up as the elder of two brothers and their father died in 1885. From 1891–94, the young Brancker attended Bedford School. His father was born in Hamburg to a British father and German mother; the Branckers were a long-established Anglo-German family that had lived in England for several generations.

On 7 April 1907, he married May Wynne, the daughter of Colonel Spencer Field of the Royal Warwickshire regiment; they had one son, also called William Sefton Brancker.

Military career
Brancker was trained for the British Army at Woolwich, joining the Royal Artillery in 1896. He served in the Second Boer War and later in India, where he made his first flight in 1910. On 18 June 1913 he was awarded the Royal Aero Club's Aviator's Certificate no. 525.

During the First World War, Brancker held important posts in the Royal Flying Corps, including Director of Military Aeronautics. In late 1915 a brigade system was introduced in the RFC and Brancker was promoted to brigadier general and appointed to command the Northern Training Brigade with his headquarters in Birmingham. This appointment was to be short-lived as in early 1916 Brancker was appointed Director of Air Organisation in London. In 1917, Brancker briefly served as the General Officer Commanding Royal Flying Corps's Palestine Headquarters and then its Middle East headquarters. Promoted to major general in 1918, he became Controller-General of Equipment in January of that year and Master-General of Personnel in August 1918. On 23 August 1918 he resigned his commission in the Army and was granted a permanent commission as major-general in the RAF. He was appointed Knight Commander of the Order of the Bath on 1 January 1919 and retired from the RAF with the rank of major-general on 13 January following. He was granted the rank of air vice-marshal in 1924.

Civil aviation
On 11 May 1922 he was made Director of Civil Aviation, and worked assiduously to stimulate UK interest in the subject with both local authorities and flying clubs. He encouraged Manchester and other cities to construct municipal airports and airfields. He participated in several long-distance survey flights, notably with Alan Cobham. He was an ardent supporter of the development of British civilian air services connecting London to British colonies and dominions overseas.

Sir Sefton was chairman of the Royal Aero Club's (RAeC) Racing Committee from 1921 to 1930 and his dynamic leadership led to the RAeC forming the Light Aero Club scheme in 1925, which helped provide the UK clubs with examples of such new and improved aircraft types as the de Havilland Moth and Avro Avian.

Death

Together with Lord Thomson, the Air Minister, Brancker was killed when the airship R101 crashed near Beauvais, France, on 5 October 1930, during its maiden voyage to India. His death occurred on the 20th anniversary of his first flight.

Legacy
In 1952 British European Airways named its 'Pionair' (Douglas DC-3) G-AKNB "Sir Sefton Brancker" to mark his substantial contribution to the development of British Aviation.

In 1996 British Airways (BA) named one of its newly delivered Boeing 777s "Sir William Sefton Branker" in recognition of his work. Other 777s in the BA fleet were named after aviation pioneers, for example "Wilbur and Orville Wright" and "Sir Frank Whittle." The aircraft (G-ZZZB) no longer carries Sir Sefton's name, aircraft names having been removed from the BA fleet since the short-lived 1997 Utopia re-branding.

Kenmore Park housing estate in Kenton Harrow has a number of its roads named after aviators including Brancker.

Brancker Road in Plymouth was named in his honour during build in the mid 1930s.

References
Footnotes

Bibliography
 Pirie, Gordon H. Air Empire: British Imperial Civil Aviation, 1919–1939. Manchester: Manchester University Press, 2009.
 Raleigh, Walter. The War In The Air: Being the Story of The part played in the Great War by The Royal Air Force: Vol I. Oxford:Clarendon Press, 1922.

Further reading

Sir Sefton Brancker by Norman Macmillan, William Heinemann Ltd, London, 1935
 Heavenly Adventurer: a biography of Sir Sefton Brancker by Basil Collier, London, 1959 
 Air Days, John F. Leeming, Harrap, London, 1936

External links

|-

|-

|-

|-

|-

|-

|-
 

|-
 

|-

|-

|-

1877 births
1930 deaths
British people of German descent
Aviation pioneers
Aviators killed in aviation accidents or incidents in France
British Army major generals
British Army personnel of the Second Boer War
English aviators
Graduates of the Royal Military Academy, Woolwich
Knights Commander of the Order of the Bath
People educated at Bedford School
Recipients of the Order of St. Vladimir, 4th class
Royal Air Force air marshals
Royal Air Force generals of World War I
Royal Artillery officers
Recipients of the Air Force Cross (United Kingdom)
Military personnel from Kent
Victims of aviation accidents or incidents in 1930